Rector Potens, Verax Deus is the name of the daily hymn for the midday office of Sext in the Roman Breviary and in the Benedictine Rite.

The text of the hymn

The original version of the Hymn ended the third line with the verb 'instruis.' This was amended during the Renaissance to the more stylistic verb 'illuminas'

The purpose and meaning of the hymn
As a hymn for the midday office, the focus of the hymn is physically upon the midday sun. Metaphorically and allegorically the hymn goes from the heat of the sun, to the heat of argument, which the hymn asks God's assistance to avoid. In Christian tradition midday was considered the time when Eve was tempted by Satan and committed the first sin, and so this gives added force to the prayer of the hymn, asking God to protect against strife.

The origins of the hymn are unknown. But the similarity of this hymn with the hymns for Terce (Nunc sancte nobis spiritus) and None (Rerum Deus Tenax Vigor) means that it probably shares the same author. Baudot ("The Roman Breviary", London, 1909, 34) thinks the hymn is "probably" by St. Ambrose. However none of this set of three hymns are found in the oldest Benedictine collections of hymns, where Ambrose's other works are found. All three of these hymns are found in later Celtic collections. suggesting that they probably have a different author. (For discussion of authorship, see Rerum Deus Tenax Vigor).

English translations of the hymn

Music and chants for the hymn
The hymn has been set to many different tunes. The following links give examples:

Rector Potens Verax Deus (Ferial Tone)
Rector Potens (Schola Hungarica)

Sources

References

Latin-language Christian hymns